Philippe Laudenbach (born 31 January 1936) is a French actor. He appeared in more than one hundred films since 1963.

Career
Nephew of Pierre Fresnay (born Peter Laudenbach), Philippe is formed to the French National Academy of Dramatic Arts.

He received a nomination for Molière Award for Best Supporting Actor in 1998 for his performance in The crazy's hat Luigi Pirandello.

Personal life
He is married to Francine Walter, actress and drama teacher at La Bruyère and to the Théâtre de l'Atelier.

Filmography

Theatre

References

External links

 

1936 births
Living people
People from Bourg-la-Reine
French male film actors
French male television actors
20th-century French male actors
21st-century French male actors
French National Academy of Dramatic Arts alumni